The Guanghui Bridge is a historic stone arch bridge over the Nanshi River in Nanxun, Huzhou, Zhejiang, China. In is backed by the Taoist temple Guanghui Palace.

History
The current bridge was rebuilt in 1800, in the 5th year of Jiaqing period of the Qing dynasty (1644–1911). It was renovated in 1866, in the reign of Tongzhi Emperor.

In March 1989, it was inscribed as a municipal cultural preservation unit by the Huzhou Municipal Government.

Architecture

References

Bridges in Zhejiang
Arch bridges in China
Bridges completed in 1800
Qing dynasty architecture
Buildings and structures completed in 1800
1800 in China